Re-enter Sir John is a 1932 British crime novel written by Clemence Dane and Helen Simpson. It was the sequel to the 1928 novel Enter Sir John, which had been adapted into a film Murder! by Alfred Hitchcock. The book continues the adventures of the actor-manager Sir John Saumarez.

References

Bibliography
 White, Terry. Justice Denoted: The Legal Thriller in American, British, and Continental Courtroom Literature. Praeger, 2003.

1932 British novels
British crime novels
Novels by Clemence Dane
Novels by Helen Simpson
Novels about actors
Hodder & Stoughton books